Suhas N. Diggavi from the University of California, Los Angeles was named Fellow of the Institute of Electrical and Electronics Engineers (IEEE) in 2013 for contributions to wireless networks and systems. He received a Guggenheim Fellowship in 2021.

References 

Fellow Members of the IEEE
Living people
Stanford University alumni
Year of birth missing (living people)
American electrical engineers